Narayana Guru built temples at various locations in India: Kollam, Thiruvananthapuram, Thrissur, Kannur, Anchuthengu, Thalassery, Kozhikode, Mangalore. Some of the temples built by the guru are:

 1888.
Shiva temple established at Aruvippuram, Thiruvananthapuram
 1889.
Devi Temple dedicated at Mannanthala, Thiruvananthapuram
 1892.
Temple established at AayiramThengu, Alappad, Kollam
 1893.
Temple established at Poothotta, Ernakulam
 1893.
Sri Narayana krishnan Kovil, Pilackool, Thalassery, Kannur
 1893.
Dedicated Sree Subrahmanya Temple (Sree Dharmashastha Temple), Earathu near Kayikkara Thiruvananthapuram
 1895.
Bhagavathi temple dedicated at Karunagappalli (near Kunnazathu), Kollam
 1898.
Subrhamaniya temple dedicated at Vazhamuttam, Kunnumpara, Thiruvananthapuram
 1904.
Sree Narayanapuram krishna Temple, Aashraamam, Kollam
 1907
The Sree Bhakthi Samvardhini Yogam, Kannur was constituted with the blessings of Sree Narayana Guru
 1908 February.
Jaganatha Shiva Temple at Thalasserry, Kannur dedicated.
 1909.
Foundation stone laid for temple at Mangalore
 1914.
August, Advaitha Ashramam at Aluva started.
 1914
Ernakulam (Poonurunni-Vytila Road) Sree Narayaneswaram Shiva, Parvati, Vishnu, Ganesha, Kartikeya Temple. The temple was raised at the instance of Sree Narayana Guru.
 1915.
Dedicated Jnanaswara Shiva temple at Anchuthengu
 1916.
Sree Maheshwara (Shiva) Temple at Koorkkancheri, Thrissur dedicated.
 1920
Dedicated the temple at Karamukku, Thrissur.
 1921.
Dedicated the Sree Kalakandeshwaram (Shiva) Temple, Murukumpuza, Thiruvananthapuram
 1927.
14 June, Temple dedicated at Kalavamkodam Saktiswaram - Ardhanarishvara (Cherthala Thaluk of Alappuzha District) with a mirror

Some of the other temples built by Sree Narayana Guru are
 Puthiya Kavu Subrahmanya Temple, Vakkom, Thiruvananthapuram
 Vakkom Subrahmanya Temple (Velayudhan Nada), Vakkom, Thiruvananthapuram
 Vakkom Deveshwara Temple, (Vakkom Puthan Nada), Vakkom, Thiruvananthapuram
 Mannanthala Anandavalleshwaram Parvati Devi Temple, Mannanthala, Thiruvananthapuram
 Sreekapaleshwara (Shiva) Temple, Anjuthengu, Thiruvananthapuram
 Poothotta Sree Narayana Vallabha (Shiva) Temple, Kanayanoor, Ernakulam
Ettanil Shivaparvathy Temple, Thekkumbhagam,Puthiyakavu, Ernakulam
 Vealikkattu Sree Narayanamangalam Kartikeya Temple, Kollam
 Kunninezath Sree Narayana Bhoovaneshwari Temple, Kozhikod, Karunagappalli, Kollam
 Sree Narayanamangalam Temple, Moothakunnam, North Paroor, Ernakulam
 Sree Kumaramangalam Subrahmanya Temple, Kumarakom, Kottayam
 Vezhapra Shaktiparambu Temple, Ramankary, Alappuzha
 Sree Ardhanarishvara Temple, Kumbalangy, Kochi
Sree Bhavaneeswara Temple (Shiva Temple), Palluruthy, Ernakulam district
 Sree Pillayar Kovil (Temple), Kottar, Nagar Kovil, Tamil Nadu
 Sree Gowreeshwara (Family Of Lord Shiva)Temple, Cherai, Ernakulam
 Sree Sharada Temple, Sivagiri, Varkala, Thiruvananthapuram
 Sree Anandabhuteshwaram Temple, Mezhuveli, Kozhenchery, Pathanamthitta
 Sree Pottayil Devi Temple, Nadama, Thripunithura, Ernakulam
 Sree Njaneshwara (Shiva) Temple, Puthan Nada, Chirayinkeezhu, Thiruvananthapuram
 Sree Mahadevar Temple, Nagambadam, Kottayam
 Sree Ardhanarishvara Temple, Ootuparambu, Kadakkavoor, Thiruvananthapuram
 Sree Maheshwara Temple, Sreenarayanapuram, Koorkenchery, Thrissur
 Sree Somasekharam Temple, Tannyam, Peringottukara, Thrissur
 Sree Subrahmanya Temple, Nellikkunnu, Kasaragod
 Palakkunnu Sree Bhagavati Temple, Uduma, Kasaragod
 Sree Narayaneshwaram Subrahmanya Temple, Vaikom, Kottayam
 Sree Bhadrachala Subrahmanya Temple, Valappad, Thrissur
 Sree Chidambara Temple, Kandassamkadavu, Thrissur
 Sree Kandeshwaram Sree Mahadeva Temple, Cherthala, Alappuzha
 Sree Kumarapuram Temple, Mangad, Kollam
 Manakkal Temple, Chempazanthi, Thiruvananthapuram
 Sree Balasubrahmanya Temple, Bharananganam, Meenachil, Kottayam
 Aakalpantha Prashobhini Sree Subrahmanya Temple, Poonjar Thekkekara, Meenachil, Kottayam
 Sree Brahmapuram (Mathaanam) Temple, Vadayar, ThalayolaParambu, Kottayam
 Chernnamangalam Siva Temple, Koduvazhannoor, Pulimath Vazhi, Thiruvananthapuram
 Sree Shakteeshwaram Temple, Vayalar, Alappuzha
 Ullala Omkareshwara (Shiva) Temple, Thalayazham, Vaikom, Kottayam
 Sree Nayinaar Deva Temple, Arumanoor, Neyyattinkara, Thiruvananthapuram
 Sree Vishwanatha Temple, Manathala, Gurupadapuri, Chavakad, Thrissur
 Vallabhasseril Siva Temple, Alamthuruthi, Tiruvalla, Pathanamthitta
 Sree Sankara Narayana Temple, Koovappadi, Cheranellur, Ernakulam
 Katiravan Kunnu Sree Balasubrahmanya Swamy Temple, Puthoor, Kollam
 Sree Narayana Maheshwara Temple, Pullazhi, Thrissur
 Myladum Kunnu Bhajana Madom Subrahmanya Temple, Anappad, Thiruvananthapuram
 Kumarapuram Sree Subrahmanya Temple, Maannanam, Kottayam
 Sree Ghuhanandapuram Temple, Thekkumbhagam, Chavara, Kollam
 Kuppana Sree Velayudhamangala Temple, Kollam
 Sree Swamy Madom Temple, Anjuthengu, Thiruvananthapuram
 Sree Amruthamkulangara Temple, Kollam
 Bhuvaneshwari Temple, Thachankonam, Varkala, Thiruvananthapuram
 Sree Chidambaranatha Temple, Oottara, Kanjiramkulam, Thiruvananthapuram
 Sree Kalikulangara Temple, Nandyattukunnam, Paravoor, Ernakulam
 Sanmargasandayini Sree Anandasayaneshwaram Temple, Kayippuram, Muhamma, Alappuzha
 Sree Shaktidhara Temple, Njarakkal, Vaipin, Ernakulam
 Sree Narayana MahavishnuTemple, Puliyannur, Meenachil, Kottayam
 Sree Narayanapuram Temple, Aashraamam, Kollam
 Plavazhikam Devi Temple, Nedunganda, Varkala, Thiruvananthapuram
 Shivadarshana Devaswom Temple, Pampadi, Kottayam
 Elankavu Sree Bhagavati Temple, Mullakkal, Alappuzha
 Chakkumarassery Srikumara Ganeshamangalam Temple, Vatanappally, Thrissur
 Sree Suryanarayanapuram Temple, Pampadi, Kottayam
 Sree Balasubrahmannya Temple, Kurichikara, Thrissur
 Dharmagiri Sree Subrahmanya Swamy Temple, Thruthala, Palakkad
 Erected Madam (Guruswamy Mutt) at Kudakkalam, near Thalassery, Kannur
 Sri Narayana Kovil, Pilackool, Thalassery, Kannur

References

 SNA website Link SNA 
 Billava Bombay Link  

Narayana Guru